Hans N. Weiler is a Professor Emeritus of Education and Political Science at Stanford University, and a Professor Emeritus of Comparative Politics and former rector of the Viadrina European University in Frankfurt (Oder), Germany.

Early life 
On September 13, 1934, Weiler was born in Krefeld, Germany.

Education 
Weiler graduated from the Hochschule St. Georgen, Frankfurt/Main in Philosophy (1956) and went on to study Philosophy, Political Science, and Education at the University of Freiburg/Breisgau, where he graduated in 1960, followed by a stay at the University of London's Institute of Commonwealth Studies and School of Oriental and African Studies.
In 1965, Weiler obtained a PhD. In Political Science from University of Freiburg.

Career 
In 1962, Weiler became a Research Fellow and Chairman of the Africa Division at the University of Freiburg's Arnold Bergstraesser institute.

That same year Weiler became Assistant Professor of Education and Political Science at Stanford University (Associate Professor as of 1971, full Professor 1979). From 1974-77 he was on leave as Director of the International Institute for Educational Planning (UNESCO) at Paris.

From 1993-99 Weiler was Professor of Comparative Politics and Rektor of the Europa-Universität Viadrina at Frankfurt/Oder.

Personal life 
Weiler is a naturalized U.S. citizen.
Weiler is married and has two sons.

Awards and honors
British Council Postgraduate Research Fellow, University of London, 1960–61
Scholar-in-Residence, Institute for German Studies, Indiana University, 1971
Academy Associate (to James B. Conant), National Academy of Education, 1972
University Fellow, Stanford University, 1979–81
Claude Eggertsen Lecture, Comparative and International Education Society, Atlanta, 1983
Research Fellow, Japan Society for the Promotion of Science, 1988
Fellow, Center for Advanced Study in the Behavioral Sciences, 1988–89
Research Fellow: Friedrich Ebert Foundation, 1990; Deutscher Akademischer Austauschdienst, 1991
The Lauwerys Memorial Lecture, Comparative Education Society of Europe, Groningen, 1998
Commander’s Cross of the Order of Merit of the Republic of Poland, 1999
Honorary Citizenship, City of Frankfurt (Oder), 2000
Officer’s Cross of the Order of Merit of the Federal Republic of Germany, 2001
Honorary doctorate (Dr. phil. h.c.), Viadrina European University, 2002
“Reformer of the Decade Award”, Centrum für Hochschulentwicklung (CHE), 2004

References

External links
 Publications

1934 births
Stanford Graduate School of Education faculty
Living people
Recipients of the Cross of the Order of Merit of the Federal Republic of Germany